The Schneebiger Nock (Italian: Monte Nevoso), in old literature also called the Ruthnerhorn, is 3,358 metres high and, after the Hochgall, the second highest mountain of the Rieserferner Group, a range in the western part of the High Tauern. The mountain rises in the Italian province of South Tyrol in the  Rieserferner-Ahrn Nature Park (Parco Naturale Vedrette di Ries-Aurina). It was first climbed on 6 October 1866 by Archduke Rainer Ferdinand of Austria, Count Heinrich Wurmbrand, and mountain guides, Georg Auer, Johann Oberarzbacher from Rein in Taufers and Georg Weiss, an innkeeper from St. Johann im Reintal. Today the  Schneebige Nock may be reached from the Kasseler Hut (also Hochgall Hut) to the northeast or from the Rieserferner Hut to the south. Thanks to its prominent pyramidal shape and its distinct arêtes it is a frequently visited viewing summit.

Literature and maps 
 Helmut Dumler: Gebietsführer Südtirol 3, Bergverlag Rudolf Rother, Munich, 1987, 
 Johann Daimer und Reinhold Seyerlen in einem Beitrag der Zeitschrift des Deutschen und Oesterreichischen Alpenvereins, Band XI, Munich, 1880
 Jahrbuch des Oesterreichischen Alpenvereins, Band III, 1867, Vienna, 1867
 Carl Diener in Eduard Richter (ed.): Die Erschließung der Ostalpen, III. Band, Berlin, 1894
 Raimund von Klebelsberg: Geologie von Tirol, Gebr. Borntraeger, Berlin, 1935
 Casa Editrice Tabacco, Tavagnacco, walking map 1:25,000 series, Sheet 035, Valle Aurina/Ahrntal, Vedrette di Ries/Rieserferner-Gruppe

External links 

Mountains of South Tyrol
Mountains of the Alps
Alpine three-thousanders
Rieserferner Group
Rieserferner-Ahrn Nature Park